These are the partial results of the athletics competition at the 1991 Mediterranean Games taking place in July 1991 in Athens, Greece.

Men's results

100 meters
Heats – 6 JulyWind: Heat 1: -1.1 m/s, Heat 2: -0.5 m/s

Final – 6 JulyWind: +0.4 m/s

200 meters
Heats – 10 JulyWind: Heat 1: +0.6 m/s, Heat 2: -1.9 m/s

Final – 10 JulyWind: -1.0 m/s

400 meters
Heats – 6 July

Final – 7 July

800 meters
Heats – 6 July

Final – 7 July

1500 meters
11 July

5000 meters
10 July

10,000 meters
6 July

Marathon
9 July

110 meters hurdles
Heats – 10 JulyWind: Heat 1: +1.1 m/s, Heat 2: -0.3 m/s

Final – 10 JulyWind: +0.7 m/s

400 meters hurdles
Heats – 6 July

Final – 7 July

3000 meters steeplechase
8 July

4 x 100 meters relay
11 July

4 x 400 meters relay
11 July

20 kilometers walk
10 July

High jump
11 July

Pole vault
7 July

Long jump
8 July

Triple jump
11 July

Shot put
6 July

Discus throw
10 July

Hammer throw
7 July

Javelin throw
8 July

Decathlon
8–9 July

Women's results

100 meters
Heats – 6 JulyWind: Heat 1: +0.3 m/s, Heat 2: -0.2 m/s

Final – 6 JulyWind: +0.3 m/s

200 meters
Heats – 8 JulyWind: Heat 1: -2.0 m/s, Heat 2: +2.2 m/s

Final – 8 JulyWind: +0.2 m/s

400 meters
Heats – 6 July

Final – 7 July

800 meters
8 July

1500 meters
11 July

3000 meters
8 July

100 meters hurdles
7 JulyWind: +0.2 m/s

400 meters hurdles
Heats – 8 July

Final – 10 July

4 x 100 meters relay
11 July

4 x 400 meters relay
11 July

High jump
10 July

Long jump
6 July

Shot put
10 July

Discus throw
10 July

Javelin throw
11 July

Heptathlon (exhibition)
10/11 July

References

Mediterranean Games
1991